Nagehan Malkoç, née Gül, (born May 14, 1985) is a Turkish female boxer competing in the featherweight division. She is a member of the Kocaeli Büyükşehir Belediyesi Kağıt S.K.'s boxing team.

Nagehan Gül is from Çırdak village in Yeşilyurt, Tokat. She married on June 19, 2011 to Hakan Malkoç.

Achievements
2005 Women's European Amateur Boxing Championships Tønsberg, Norway 57 kg - 
2007 Women's European Amateur Boxing Championships Vejle, Denmark 57 kg - 
2007 Women's European Union Amateur Boxing Championships Lille, France 57 kg - 
2008 Women's European Union Amateur Boxing Championships Liverpool, England 57 kg - 
2009 Women's European Amateur Boxing Championships Mykolaiv, Ukraine 57 kg - 
2011 Turkish Prime Ministry Amateur Boxing Championships Ankara, Turkey 57 kg - 
2011 Women's European Amateur Boxing Championships Rotterdam, Netherlands 57 kg -

References

1985 births
Living people
People from Yeşilyurt, Tokat
Turkish women boxers
Featherweight boxers
Kocaeli Büyükşehir Belediyesi Kağıt Spor boxers
20th-century Turkish sportswomen
21st-century Turkish sportswomen